Whitney Mongé (born January 16, 1987) is an American singer, songwriter, and guitarist based out of Seattle, Washington.

Background 

Whitney moved from her hometown Spokane, Washington in 2007 and started her music career busking at Pike Place Market. She has appeared in film in the award-winning documentary Find Your Way: A Busker's Documentary (2014), featuring Chris Ballew of The Presidents of the United States of America and world renowned violinist Joshua Bell, on the television program Band in Seattle (2015), and acted in the short film Stella (2010). Whitney has three EPs independently released; Steadfast (2014) produced by Grammy Award winner, Pete Stewart, Stone (2016) self-produced and recorded at Stone Gossard of Pearl Jam's recording Studio Litho, and Carry On (2018) also self produced and was recorded at Robert Lang Studios and Studio Litho in Seattle. She recently released a live album with Grammy Award winning orchestra, The Seattle Symphony titled "Whitney Mongé Live with The Seattle Symphony" (2021). From 2018 to 2022, Whitney was nominated for two terms as a Governor on the Pacific Northwest Recording Academy Chapter Board (GRAMMYs).

Discography

EPs 

 Steadfast Deluxe Edition (2014, Independent)
 Stone (2017, Independent)
 Carry On (2018, Independent)
 Whitney Mongé Live with The Seattle Symphony (2021)

References

Further reading

External links

1987 births
Living people
Musicians from Seattle
People from Spokane, Washington